Leptogorgia festiva is a species of gorgonian sea fan in the family Gorgoniidae. It has been recorded in the Caribbean Sea.

References 

Gorgoniidae
Cnidarians of the Caribbean Sea
Corals described in 1860